Technological University (Hmawbi), under  Ministry of Science and Technology (Ministry of Education in 2016-2021), is located on the east of the Yangon-Pyay Highway Road, near in Hmawbi Township in the Yangon Region, Myanmar. At first, it was opened as a Technical High School (T.H.S) on 1 June 1989. Then, on 23 October 1998, it was upgraded to the Government Institute of Technology (G.T.I) and Government Technological College (G.T.C) in January, 2001. Then on 20 January 2007, it was upgraded as a Technological University (Hmawbi) also called TU(Hmawbi). All Engineering programs in TU(Hmawbi) are accredited by Myanmar Engineering Council, which is national accreditation body for engineering education. Moreover, it has been an accociate member of AUN-QA ( ASEAN University Network Quality Assurance) under ASEAN University Network since 25.3.2018. Furthermore, it has obtained ISO 9001:2008 certificate for Quality Management System in 2015 and upgraded to ISO 9001:2015 version in 2018 from Bureau Veritas. There are a total of 33 Technological Universities in Myanmar and 
Technological University (Hmawbi), Technological University (Thanlyin) and West Yangon Technological University are best engineering schools in Myanmar after Yangon Technological University and Mandalay Technological University.

List of rectors

Programs

Departments

Degree Program

Bachelor of Engineering (B.E)

Graduate Degree Program

Master of Engineering (M.E)

See also 
Yangon Technological University
Mandalay Technological University
Technological University, Thanlyin
West Yangon Technological University
List of Technological Universities in Myanmar

References

External links
 https://www.hbtu.edu.mm/

Universities and colleges in Yangon
Technological universities in Myanmar

vi:Đại học Công nghệ Yangon